Al-Barazi is a surname.

List of people with the surname 

 Azad Al-Barazi (born 1988), American-Syrian swimmer
 Muhsin al-Barazi (1904–1949), Syrian lawyer, academic and politician
 Talal Al-Barazi (born 1963), Syrian politician

See also 

 Barazi

Surnames
Arabic-language surnames